Abdolreza Kiani Nejad (June 21, 1952-April 5, 1997), more commonly known as Maziar , also spelled Mazyar, was a prominent Iranian singer.

Discography

Studio albums

 A singer, A song Vol. 2 – Persian Music ℗ 1976 Caspian
 Persian Music Hits CD 7 ℗ 1976 Caspian
 Golden Songs No. 8 – Persian Music ℗ 1976 Caspian
 Mahigir – Persian Music ℗ 1978 Caspian
 Harf Bezan ℗ 1985 Taraneh Enterprises Inc
 50 Songs of 50 Years Vol 1  ℗ 2005 Taraneh Enterprises Inc
 Mahee Gir  ℗ 2008 Pars Video
 Ay Iran ℗ 2008 Pars Video
 Asheghaneh No. 1 ℗ 2008 Pars Video
 Old But Gold Vol. 8  ℗ 2008 Pars Video
 Lazehyeh Bidari ℗ 2008 Pars Video
 Khazteh – Ep ℗ 2009 Pars Video 
 Red House ℗ 2009 Pars Video
 Love Songs 7 ℗ 2009 Pars Video 
 Arezooye Farda
 Zemzemeh
 Tanhaei
 Harf
 Koodake Gharn
 Gole Gandom (1994)

Single Songs
 Aziz
 Hamsar
 Harf Bezan
 Shokate Boodan
 To Ke Nisti
 Saghi
 Koodake Gharn
 Faryaad
 Kabootar
 Vatan Ey Aziztarinam
 Gharib
 Sargashteh
 Khasteh
 Iran Iran
 Adat
 Yousofe Gomgashteh
 Arezooye Farda
 Salar
 Baghche

References

People from Babol
1952 births
1997 deaths
20th-century Iranian male singers
Iranian pop singers
Iranian singer-songwriters